Robertson's department store may refer to:
Robertson Company also known as Robertson’s department store, Hollywood, California
Robertson’s department store, South Bend, Indiana